Maria Boldor (born 3 August 1996) is a Romanian right-handed foil fencer. She won one of the bronze medals in the women's foil event at the 2022 World Fencing Championships held in Cairo, Egypt.

She competed at the European Fencing Championships in 2013, 2014 and 2015. She represented Romania at the 2015 European Games held in Baku, Azerbaijan. She competed in the women's foil event.

In 2017, she competed in the women's foil event at the World Fencing Championships held in Leipzig, Germany. In that same year, she also competed in the women's individual foil and women's team foil events at the 2017 Summer Universiade held in Taipei, Taiwan.

She competed in the women's foil event at the 2019 World Fencing Championships held in Budapest, Hungary.

References

External links 
 

Living people
1996 births
Place of birth missing (living people)
Romanian female foil fencers
European Games competitors for Romania
Fencers at the 2015 European Games
Competitors at the 2017 Summer Universiade
World Fencing Championships medalists
21st-century Romanian women